Something Something may refer to:

 Unakkum Enakkum, a 2006 Tamil-language film formerly known as Something Something... Unakkum Enakkum 
 Something Something (2012 film), an Odia-language film
 Something Something (2013 film), a Telugu-dubbed version of Tamil-language film Theeya Velai Seiyyanum Kumaru
 Something Something (album), a 2006 album by Mika Singh